Irmgard Lanthaler was an Italian luger who competed in the mid-1980s. A natural track luger, she won two medals in the women's singles event at the FIL World Luge Natural Track Championships (Gold: 1986, Bronze: 1984).

Lanthaler also won two silver medals in the women's singles event at the FIL European Luge Natural Track Championships (1983, 1985).

References
Natural track European Championships results 1970-2006.
Natural track World Championships results: 1979-2007

Italian female lugers
Year of birth missing (living people)
Living people
Italian lugers
Sportspeople from Südtirol